Western Rukum 1 is the parliamentary constituency of Western Rukum District in Nepal. This constituency came into existence on the Constituency Delimitation Commission (CDC) report submitted on 31 August 2017.

Incorporated areas 
Western Rukum 1 incorporates the entirety of Western Rukum District.

Assembly segments 
It encompasses the following Karnali Provincial Assembly segment

 Western Rukum 1(A)
 Western Rukum 1(B)

Members of Parliament

Parliament/Constituent Assembly

Provincial Assembly

1(A)

1(B)

Election results

Election in the 2020s

2022 general election

2022 provincial election

1(A)

1(B)

Election in the 2010s

2017 general election

2017 provincial election

1(A)

1(B)

See also 

 List of parliamentary constituencies of Nepal

References

External links 

 Constituency map of Western Rukum

Parliamentary constituencies of Nepal
2017 establishments in Nepal
Constituencies established in 2017
Western Rukum District